Žalna (in older sources also Žalina) is a settlement in the Municipality of Grosuplje in central Slovenia. It lies southeast of Grosuplje in the historical region of Lower Carniola. The municipality is now included in the Central Slovenia Statistical Region. It includes the hamlets of Prevale, Velika Žalna (in older sources also Velika Žalina), and Mala Žalna (in older sources also Mala Žalina), as well as part of the hamlet of Na Šoli.

Church

The parish church in the settlement is dedicated to Saint Lawrence and belongs to the Roman Catholic Archdiocese of Ljubljana. In dates to the 17th century with 18th- and 19th-century extensions.

References

External links

Žalna on Geopedia

Populated places in the Municipality of Grosuplje